Solid acid fuel cells (SAFCs) are a class of fuel cells characterized by the use of a solid acid material as the electrolyte. Similar to proton exchange membrane fuel cells and solid oxide fuel cells, they extract electricity from the electrochemical conversion of hydrogen- and oxygen-containing gases, leaving only water as a byproduct. Current SAFC systems use hydrogen gas obtained from a range of different fuels, such as industrial-grade propane and diesel. They operate at mid-range temperatures, from 200 to 300 °C.

Design
Solid acids are chemical intermediates between salts and acids, such as CsHSO4.  Solid acids of interest for fuel cell applications are those whose chemistry is based on oxyanion groups (SO42-, PO43−, SeO42−, AsO43−) linked together by hydrogen bonds and charge-balanced by large cation species (Cs+, Rb+, NH4+, K+).

At low temperatures, solid acids have an ordered molecular structure like most salts. At warmer temperatures (between 140 and 150 degrees Celsius for CsHSO4), some solid acids undergo a phase transition to become highly disordered "superprotonic" structures, which increases conductivity by several orders of magnitude. When used in fuel cells, this high conductivity allows for efficiencies of up to 50% on various fuels.

The first proof-of-concept SAFCs were developed in 2000 using cesium hydrogen sulfate (CsHSO4). However, fuel cells using acid sulfates as an electrolyte result in byproducts that severely degrade the fuel cell anode, which leads to diminished power output after only modest usage.

Current SAFC systems use cesium dihydrogen phosphate (CsH2PO4) and have demonstrated lifetimes in the thousands of hours.  When undergoing a superprotonic phase transition, CsH2PO4 experiences an increase in conductivity by four orders of magnitude. In 2005, it was shown that CsH2PO4 could stably undergo the superprotonic phase transition in a humid atmosphere at an "intermediate" temperature of 250 °C, making it an ideal solid acid electrolyte to use in a fuel cell. A humid environment in a fuel cell is necessary to prevent certain solid acids (such as CsH2PO4) from dehydration and dissociation into a salt and water vapor.

Electrode Reactions 

Hydrogen gas is channeled to the anode, where it is split into protons and electrons. Protons travel through the solid acid electrolyte to reach the Cathode, while electrons travel to the cathode through an external circuit, generating electricity. At the cathode, protons and electrons recombine along with oxygen to produce water that is then removed from the system.

Anode: H2 → 2H+ + 2e−

Cathode: ½O2 + 2H+ + 2e− → H2O

Overall: H2 + ½O2 → H2O

The operation of SAFCs at mid-range temperatures allows them to utilize materials that would otherwise be damaged at high temperatures, such as standard metal components and flexible polymers. These temperatures also make SAFCs tolerant to impurities in their hydrogen source of fuel, such as carbon monoxide or sulfur components. For example, SAFCs can utilize hydrogen gas extracted from propane, natural gas, diesel, and other hydrocarbons.

Fabrication and Production 
Sossina Haile developed the first solid acid fuel cells in the 1990s.

In 2005, SAFCs were fabricated with thin electrolyte membranes of 25 micrometer thickness, resulting in an eightfold increase in peak power densities compared to earlier models. Thin electrolyte membranes are necessary to minimize the voltage lost due to internal resistance within the membrane.

According to Suryaprakash et al. 2014, the ideal solid acid fuel cell anode is a "porous electrolyte nanostructure uniformly covered with a platinum thin film." This group used a method called spray drying to fabricate SAFCs, depositing CsH2PO4 solid acid electrolyte nanoparticles and creating porous, 3-dimensional interconnected nanostructures of the solid acid fuel cell electrolyte material CsH2PO4.

Mechanical Stability 
Compared to their high operating temperature counterparts such as high temperature protonic ceramic fuel cells or solid oxide fuel cells, solid acid fuel cells benefit from operating at low temperatures where plastic deformation and creep mechanisms are less likely to cause permanent damage to the cell materials. Permanent deformation occurs more readily at elevated temperatures because defects present within the material have sufficient energy to move and disrupt the original structure. Lower temperature operation also allows for the use of non-refractory materials which tends to decrease the cost of the SAFC.   

However, solid acid fuel cell electrolyte materials are still susceptible to mechanical degradation under normal operating conditions above their superprotonic phase transition temperatures due to the superplasticity enabled by this transition. Since fuel cells often require pressures in this range to properly seal the device and prevent leaks, creep is likely to degrade the cells by creating a short circuiting path. The same study showed that the strain rate, as modeled using the standard steady-state creep equation , has a stress exponent of   typically associated with a dislocation glide mechanism, and an activation energy of 1.02 eV. n is the stress exponent, Q is the creep activation energy, and A is a constant that depends on the creep mechanism. 

Creep resistance can be obtained by precipitate strengthening using a composite electrolyte whereby ceramic particles are introduced to prevent dislocation motion. For example, the strain rate of CsH2PO4 was reduced by a factor of 5 by mixing in SiO2 particles with a size of 2 microns, however resulting in a 20% decrease in protonic conductivity. 

Other studies have looked at CsH2PO4/epoxy resin composites where micron size particles of CsH2PO4 are embedded in a cross-linked polymer matrix. A comparison between the flexural strength of an SiO2 composite versus an epoxy composite demonstrated that while the strengths themselves are similar, the flexibility of the epoxy composite is superior, a property which is essential in preventing electrolyte fracture during operation. The epoxy composite also shows comparable but slightly lower conductivities than the SiO2 composite when operating at temperatures below 200 °C.

Applications 
Because of their moderate temperature requirements and compatibility with several types of fuel, SAFCs can be utilized in remote locations where other types of fuel cells would be impractical. In particular, SAFC systems for remote oil and gas applications have been deployed to electrify wellheads and eliminate the use of pneumatic components, which vent methane and other potent greenhouse gases straight into the atmosphere. A smaller, portable SAFC system is in development for military applications that will run on standard logistic fuels, like marine diesel and JP8.

In 2014, a toilet that chemically transforms waste into water and fertilizer was developed using a combination of solar power and SAFCs.

References 

Fuel cells